Domestic Science Building may refer to:

Domestic Science Building (Normal, Alabama), listed on the National Register of Historic Places in Madison County, Alabama
Domestic Science Building (Arkadelphia, Arkansas), NRHP-listed
Girls' Domestic Science and Arts Building, Russellville, Arkansas, NRHP-listed
Domestic Science and Manual Training School, St. Petersburg, Florida, NRHP-listed